Groene Leeuw (English: Green Lion) was a Belgian professional cycling team that existed from 1945 to 1969. Its main sponsor was Belgian bicycle manufacturer Groene Leeuw. Among the various co-sponsors was the Belgian beer Wiel's. In the 1960 Vuelta a España, the team finished with the top two placings in the general classification of the 1960 Vuelta a España, with Frans De Mulder first and Armand Desmet second.

References

External links

Cycling teams based in Belgium
Defunct cycling teams based in Belgium
1945 establishments in Belgium
1969 disestablishments in Belgium
Cycling teams established in 1945
Cycling teams disestablished in 1969